"Feel Right" is a song written by Larry Byrom, and recorded by American country music artist Tanya Tucker.  It was released in November 1982 as the first single from the album Changes.  The song reached #10 on the Billboard Hot Country Singles & Tracks chart.

Chart performance

References

1983 singles
1982 songs
Tanya Tucker songs
Song recordings produced by David Malloy
MCA Records singles